Ptychozoon was a genus of arboreal geckos, endemic to Southeast Asia, known commonly as flying geckos, gliding geckos, or parachute geckos. They all are now placed in the genus Gekko in the family Gekkonidae. The biogeographic history of the genus Ptychozoon was deeply nested within that of the genus Gekko, the center of diversity of which is within Southeast Asia. Since dispersing into Southeast Asian rainforests, Pytochozoon, like other forest-dwelling vertebrates, adapted to facilitate gliding. All species in the genus Ptychozoon are characterized by cryptic coloration and elaborate webs surrounding the neck, limbs, trunk, and tail. These membranes help to conceal the gecko against trees. When the gecko leaps into the air, the flaps are used to generate lift and allow the gecko to control its fall. Also it does a swoop at the end of its glide to land softly. A similar adaptation is found in geckos of the genus Cosymbotus. There were thirteen described species in the genus Ptychozoon.

Species
The following species were recognized as being valid.
Ptychozoon bannaense  – Banna parachute gecko
Ptychozoon cicakterbang  – Malaysia parachute gecko
Ptychozoon horsfieldii  – Horsfield's flying gecko, Horsfield's parachute gecko
Ptychozoon intermedium  – intermediate flying gecko, Philippine parachute gecko
Ptychozoon kabkaebin  – Lao parachute gecko
Ptychozoon kaengkrachanense  – Kaeng Krachan parachute gecko
Ptychozoon kuhli  – Kuhl's flying gecko, Kuhl's parachute gecko
Ptychozoon lionotum  – smooth-backed gliding gecko, smooth-backed flying gecko, Burmese flying gecko, Burmese parachute gecko
Ptychozoon nicobarensis  – Nicobar gliding gecko
Ptychozoon popaense  – Mt. Popa parachute gecko
Ptychozoon rhacophorus  – Sabah flying gecko
Ptychozoon tokehos  – Cambodian parachute gecko
Ptychozoon trinotaterra 

Nota bene: A binomial authority in parentheses indicates that the species was originally described in a genus other than Ptychozoon.

References

Further reading

External links
 Global Gecko Association

Geckos
Gliding animals
Taxa named by Heinrich Kuhl
Lizard genera
Taxa named by Johan Conrad van Hasselt